Winogradskyella tangerina is a Gram-negative and rod-shaped bacterium from the genus of Winogradskyella which has been isolated from sediments from the coast of Weihai.

References

Flavobacteria
Bacteria described in 2018